Liknes is the administrative centre of Kvinesdal municipality in Agder county, Norway.

The village is the largest urban area in the municipality. There are stores, a school, and Kvinesdal Church. Just east of the village is the Saron Valley where the missionary center,  is located. From 1900 until 1917, the municipality of Kvinesdal was named Liknes, after the village.

Media gallery

References

Villages in Agder
Kvinesdal